Mount Bundey may refer to.

Mount Bundey, Northern Territory, a locality
Mount Bundey Training Area, a military training area located in Mount Bundey, Northern Territory

See also
Bundey (disambiguation)
Hundred of Bundey (disambiguation)
Mount Bundy Station, a pastoral lease in the Northern Territory of Australia